"I'm in Love (I Wanna Do It)" is a song by Italian house DJ Alex Gaudino from his second studio album, Doctor Love (2013). The song was written by Gaudino, Giuseppe D'Albenzio and Tim Powell. It was released as the lead single from the album on 19 September 2010 in the United Kingdom. The song reached number 10 in the UK, and charted at number one on Billboards Hot Dance Airplay chart in October 2010. The song originally only contained male vocals, but the vocals of American singer Maxine Ashley were later added for commercial release. Ashley, however, is not officially credited as a guest vocalist on the commercial release.

Track listing

Credits and personnel
Alex Gaudino – songwriter, producer, performer, arrangement and recording
Giuseppe D'Albenzio – songwriter
Tim Powell – songwriter, mixing and additional vocal production
Jason Rooney – producer, performer, arrangement and recording
John Biancale – male vocals
Maxine Ashley – female vocals

Source:

Charts

Weekly charts

Year-end charts

Release history

References

2010 singles
2010 songs
Alex Gaudino songs
House music songs
Ministry of Sound singles
Songs written by Alex Gaudino
Songs written by Tim Powell (producer)